Volgogradsky Prospekt is a Moscow Metro station in the Nizhegorodsky District, South-Eastern Administrative Okrug, Moscow. It is on the Tagansko-Krasnopresnenskaya Line, between Proletarskaya and Kuzminki stations. Volgogradsky Prospekt was opened on 31 December 1966 as part of the Zhadovsky radius and is named after the nearby Avenue that leads on from the centre of Moscow into an intercity highway all the way to the southwest of Russia, although not directly to Volgograd. The station was built to a slight modification of the standard 1960s pillar-trispan decoration showing the first signs of innovative design, as architects V. Polikarpova and A. Marova did. The platform is narrowed (as the station was never designed to carry large passenger crowds). The white ceramic tiles on the walls are arranged on 45 degrees to the platform and are decorated with metallic artworks out of anodized aluminium depicting the Battle of Stalingrad (artist E. Ladygin). The pillars are faced with white marble whilst the floor with grey granite. The station has two underground vestibules with glazed concrete pavilions which allow passengers access to the Talalikhin and Novostapovskaya streets as well as directly to the AZLK automobile plant..

External links
metro.ru
mymetro.ru
KartaMetro.info — Station location and exits on Moscow map (English/Russian)

Moscow Metro stations
Railway stations in Russia opened in 1966
Tagansko-Krasnopresnenskaya Line
Railway stations located underground in Russia